Diljá Pétursdóttir (born 2001), known mononymously as Diljá, is an Icelandic singer. She is set to represent Iceland in the Eurovision Song Contest 2023 with the song "Power".

Biography
Diljá made her name by participating in the talent show Ísland Got Talent in 2015. In 2020, she moved to Copenhagen, where she alternated her studies in physiotherapy with singing lessons.

In January 2023, Diljá was confirmed among the 10 participants in the annual Söngvakeppnin, a festival used to select the Icelandic representative in the Eurovision Song Contest. On 18 February, she presented her unreleased single Lifandi inni í mér during the first semi-final, and qualified for the final. At the final on 4 March, she presented the English-language Eurovision version of her song, Power. She went on to win the competition, beating Langi Seli og Skuggarnir in the superfinal, making her the Icelandic representative at the Eurovision Song Contest 2023 in Liverpool. Lifandi inní mér reached the 11th position of the Icelandic chart, while Power was placed 29th.

Discography

Singles
 2023 – "Power"

See also
Iceland in the Eurovision Song Contest 2023

References

External links

 

2001 births
Living people
People from Kópavogur
Eurovision Song Contest entrants of 2023
Eurovision Song Contest entrants for Iceland
Icelandic pop singers
Icelandic emigrants to Denmark
21st-century Icelandic women singers